The Galician People's Party (PPG) was a Galician political party in the first years of the Spanish democracy.

History
It was founded in July 1976 as a result of the union of the Democratic Union of Galicia, led by Xaime Illa Couto, and the Galician Democratic Left, led by Fernando García Agudín. They participated in the activities of the Christian Democratic Team of the Spanish State, but they didn't enter it. In the general elections of 1977 it allied with the Galician Social Democratic Party. It disappeared in 1979. Some of its members joined the Partido Galeguista and others the Democratic Center Union.

References

   Manuel Anxo Fernández Baz, A formación do nacionalismo contemporáneo (1963-1984), Laiovento, 2003.
   Beramendi, J e Núñez Seixas, O Nacionalismo Galego, Edicións A Nosa Terra, Vigo, 1995.
   Rodríguez-Polo, Xosé Ramón: Ramón Piñeiro e a estratexia do galeguismo. Xerais, Vigo, 2009.
   Rodríguez-Polo, Xosé Ramón: O triunfo do galeguismo. Opinión pública, partidos políticos e comportamento electoral na transición autonómica, Dykinson, Madrid, 2009.

Political parties in Galicia (Spain)
Galician nationalism
Political parties established in 1976
Political parties disestablished in 1979
1976 establishments in Spain
1979 disestablishments in Spain